Te Whenuanui  (c. 1815 – 1907), also known as Te Haka, was a notable New Zealand Tūhoe chief, builder and carver. He was born in Maungapohatu, Bay of Plenty, New Zealand. As a carver, some of Te Whenuanui's work included the house Te Whai-a-te-motu at Ruatahuna, made to symbolise the hardships Tūhoe had faced during the New Zealand Wars.

References

1907 deaths
New Zealand Māori carvers
Ngāi Tūhoe people
People from the Bay of Plenty Region
Year of birth uncertain